The Beiji Temple is a Chinese temple dedicated to Xuantian Shangdi in West Central District, Tainan, Taiwan.

History
The temple has undergone several renovations. In 1804, an additional building was added at the back side of the temple for temporary accommodations for soldiers and townsmen. In 1907, the temple front was demolished for road expansion. In 1964, the temple was demolished again when a 15-meter wide road was constructed by the Tainan City Government. The front hall of the temple was restored in 1971.

Transportation
The temple is accessible within walking distance southwest of Tainan Station of the Taiwan Railways.

See also
 Grand Matsu Temple
 Taiwan Confucian Temple
 State Temple of the Martial God
 Temple of the Five Concubines
 List of temples in Taiwan
 List of tourist attractions in Taiwan
 Magong Beiji Temple

References

Taoist temples in Tainan
National monuments of Taiwan